is a 1952 Japanese drama film directed by Kaneto Shindō. It was entered into the 1953 Cannes Film Festival.

Plot
Takako Ishikawa (Nobuko Otowa) is a teacher on an island in the inland sea off the coast of post-war Hiroshima. During her summer holiday, she takes the ferry to her hometown Hiroshima to visit the graves of her parents and younger sister, who were killed in the Atomic bombing. She sees a beggar and recognises him as Iwakichi (Osamu Takizawa), a former servant of her parents, now burned on the face and partially blind. She follows him to his poor shack, where he is looked after by a woman living next door, and asks about his family. With his wife, his son and daughter-in-law dead, Iwakichi's only surviving relative is his grandson Tarō, who lives in an orphanage. Takako visits the orphanage and finds the children barely have enough to eat. She offers to take Iwakichi and his grandson back with her, but Iwakichi refuses, running away.

Takako goes on to visit Natsue Morikawa, a former colleague at the kindergarten where she used to teach, and now a midwife. Natsue has been rendered sterile as an aftereffect of the bomb, and is planning to adopt a child with her husband. Natsue and Takako visit the site of the kindergarten, which is now destroyed, and Takako decides to visit the students of the kindergarten.

The father of the first student she visits, Sanpei, has suddenly been taken ill from a radiation-related illness and dies just before she arrives. Another one of the students is terminally ill and dying in a church, where many people with bomb-related injuries are gathered.

After staying the night in Natsue's house, she then goes to visit another student, Heita. His sister (Miwa Satō), who has an injured leg, is just about to get married, and Takako dines with her. She talks to Heita's older brother Kōji (Jūkichi Uno) about the people who died or were injured in the war.

She returns to Iwakichi's house and asks him again to let her take Tarō back to the island. At first he refuses, but later his neighbour convinces him to let Takako take care of Tarō. However, Tarō still refuses to leave his grandfather. On the last evening before Takako's departure, Iwakichi invites Tarō for a meal, gives him new shoes he bought for him, and sends him to Takako with a letter. Then he sets his house on fire. He survives the fire but is badly burned and eventually dies. Tarō leaves Hiroshima together with Takako, carrying his grandfather's ashes.

Cast
 Nobuko Otowa as Takako Ishikawa
 Osamu Takizawa as Iwakichi
 Miwa Saitō as Natsue Morikawa
 Tsuneko Yamanaka as child
 Hideji Ōtaki as Nagaya man
 Takashi Itō as Taro
 Chikako Hosokawa as Setsu, Takako's mother
 Masao Shimizu as Toshiaki, Takako's father
 Yuriko Hanabusa as Oine
 Tanie Kitabayashi as Otoyo
 Tsutomu Shimomoto as Natsue's husband
 Eijirō Tōno
 Taiji Tonoyama as owner of a ship
 Jūkichi Uno as Kōji

Production 
The film was commissioned by the Japan Teachers Union and was based on first-person testimonies gathered by Japanese educator Arata Osada, collected in the 1951 book Children of the Atomic Bomb. The end of the post-war occupation of Japan by American forces allowed the production of works addressing the atomic bombings of Hiroshima and Nagaski.

Reception
The film was successful in Japan on its initial release and had its international premiere at the 1953 Cannes Film Festival, but the Japan Teachers Union, which had commissioned the film, criticized its "outsider" view of the physical and personal devastation of the bombing and especially the lack of clear political and social criticism, concentrating instead on the stories of a few individuals. The union then commissioned another film, Hiroshima (released in 1953), by director Hideo Sekigawa, which was far more graphic in its depiction of the bombing's aftermath and far more critical of both American and Japanese leaders who had brought about the disaster.

In 1959, film historian Donald Richie perceived a major weakness in the film, its "coupling of the most lifelike naturalism with truly excessive sentimentality", but emphasized that "it showed the aftermath of the bomb without any vicious polemic".

Children of Hiroshima was met with positive reviews on its American debut in 2011. In a review of the film, where he also comments on its place in Kaneto Shindō's career, The New York Times critic A.O. Scott remarks: "Mr. Shindo combines austerity and sensuality to stirring, sometimes mesmerizing effect. The beauty of the compositions in Children of Hiroshima — the clarity of focus, the graceful balance within the frames — provides some relief from the grimness of his subject. […] He contemplates Japan’s wartime experience with regret, rather than indignation".

In The Village Voice, J. Hoberman called it "a somber melodrama" which lacks in subtlety but has "the capacity to wound". Film scholar Alexander Jacoby resumed, "it remains one of Shindo’s most moving films, and a testament to the anti-war spirit that took root in Japan after its defeat".

The film holds a score of 86/100 on review aggregation site Metacritic.

Themes and Analysis
The film commemorates the a-bomb attack on Hiroshima and the tragedies that followed, which the U.S. forces censored during their occupation of Japan that ended months before the film’s release. The film commemorates the hibakusha people and highlights how they were ostracized in Japanese society through characters who are refused work due to their visible injuries caused by the bombs and the radiation. However, the film also promotes Japan’s sentiment of victimization through the tragedy of nuclear attacks. It leaves out the struggles of other Asian countries during the war and how Japan was also a victimizer. There is a lack of a larger context of wartime Japan within the film as it depicts Japan as a calm and prosperous place before the bombs. The film displays the victimization of Japan in flashback scenes of the bombing, where children cry over their dead mother's bodies, representing a broken bond of life. The film’s emphasis on the destruction that followed the bombing resonates with the anti-war and pro-democracy messages of several social interest groups, including the Japan Teachers Union.

References

External links

 
 
 
 

1952 films
1952 drama films
Japanese drama films
1950s Japanese-language films
Japanese black-and-white films
Films based on non-fiction books
Anti-war films about World War II
Films about the atomic bombings of Hiroshima and Nagasaki
Films directed by Kaneto Shindo
Films set in Hiroshima
Japanese avant-garde and experimental films
Films shot in Hiroshima
Works about children in war
Films scored by Akira Ifukube
1950s Japanese films